The Union County Vocational-Technical High School (UC Tech) is a full-time vocational public high school, located in Scotch Plains in Union County, New Jersey, United States. This school serves students in ninth through twelfth grades from across Union county as a career academy on the Union County Vocational Technical Schools Campus, which also includes the Union County Academy for Allied Health Sciences, Academy for Information Technology, Union County Magnet High School and the Academy for Performing Arts. The school is accredited by the Middle States Association of Colleges and Schools Commission on Elementary and Secondary Schools.

As of the 2021–22 school year, the school had an enrollment of 514 students and 23.9 classroom teachers (on an FTE basis), for a student–teacher ratio of 21.5:1. There were 41 students (8.0% of enrollment) eligible for free lunch and 2 (0.4% of students) eligible for reduced-cost lunch.

Awards, recognition and rankings
In its listing of "America's Best High Schools 2016", the school was ranked 189th out of 500 best high schools in the country; it was ranked 29th among all high schools in New Jersey.

Schooldigger.com ranked the school tied for 18th out of 381 public high schools statewide in its 2011 rankings (a decrease of 6 positions from the 2010 ranking) which were based on the combined percentage of students classified as proficient or above proficient on the  mathematics (98.3%) and language arts literacy (100.0%) components of the High School Proficiency Assessment (HSPA).

References

External links 
Union County Vocational-Technical High School website

Data for the Union County Vocational-Technical High School, National Center for Education Statistics

Magnet schools in New Jersey
Public high schools in Union County, New Jersey
Scotch Plains, New Jersey
Educational institutions established in 2002
2002 establishments in New Jersey